Htibyuhsaung is one of 37 nats in the official Burmese pantheon of nats. He was King Kunhsaw Kyaunghpyu, father of Anawrahta. He was deposed and forced to become a monk by his stepsons, and died later.

References

28